Not Born Beautiful is a telenovela filmed in Russia, directed by Alexander Nazarov and shown from 5 September 2005 to 7 July 2006 by the Russian network STS. It is a Russian spin of the Colombian Yo soy Betty, la fea (I'm Betty, the Ugly One) telenovela, which has fostered more than a dozen versions in other countries. The telenovela reached success in Russia and boosted the ratings of the TV network STS.

Nelli Uvarova plays the role of a charming ugly girl, Yekaterina (Katya) Pushkareva.  This became a breakout role in Nelli's career and brought her national love and fame.  During the broadcast of the series she became a real star of Russian television.  Nelli's American counterpart America Ferrara also became widely known for her portrayal of the namesake of Ugly Betty.

The show attracted viewers who were not in the traditional viewing audience of telenovelas.  In fall of 2005, fully one-third of Russian TV viewers, and 58% of Ukraine viewers, were tuning in to watch the show.

According to TV's Betty Goes Global: From Telenovela to International Brand, Not Born Beautiful is likely the closest and most faithful of "Yo soy Betty, la fea"'s international adaptations.

And according to its authors, in 2004-6, Russia was "at an apex" of "consumerism and glamour culture", and:Ne rodis' krasivoy addresse[d] the central cultural conflict of post-Soviet culture:  the negotiation between the Russian (Soviet) values and the new corporate bourgeois ones.

In all 200 episodes were filmed, many on a one-per-day schedule.  The "industrial pace of shooting" matched the industrial setting, Media City's studios in the former Soviet-era State Ball-Bearing Plant Number 1 in Moscow, which operated from the 1930s to 1990.  This was 31 more episodes than in the Colombian original series.

American TV executive James Kramer and other Americans were involved in bringing "Ugly Betty" to Russia.

Plot 
Katya, a plain-looking girl, works as a secretary at the company Zimaletto, a manufacturer of uniforms and wedding dresses.  No man has paid attention to her yet, but she doesn't allow her looks to keep her from dreaming about love and happiness.

Opening theme
The song, performed by Alsou, received a 2008 Russian MTV award as the first in a medley of nine songs required to be performed by singers or groups other than the original recording artist.

Characters

Main

Recurring

Interesting Facts 
 The spin-off comedy "UmaNetto" (literally translated as No Brains), was broadcast by STS in 2007

References

External links
Ne rodis krasivoy, at IMDb
"If love lives in your heart", at YouTube, performed by Yulia Savicheva with a plain-looking second singer and snorkel parka-sporting others

Yo soy Betty, la fea
Russian telenovelas
STS (TV channel) original programming
2005 Russian television series debuts
2006 Russian television series endings
2000s Russian television series